Warren County is a county located in the U.S. state of New Jersey. According to the 2020 census, the county was the state's 19th-most populous county, with a population of 109,632, its highest decennial count ever and an increase of 940 (+0.9%) from the 2010 census count of 108,692, which in turn reflected an increase of 6,255 (+6.1%) from 102,437 counted at the 2000 census. The county borders the Delaware River and Easton, Pennsylvania in the Lehigh Valley to its west, the New York City metropolitan area to its east, and The Poconos to its northwest. Warren County constitutes part of the Lehigh Valley/Allentown-Bethlehem-Easton, PA-NJ Metropolitan Statistical Area and is the only county in New Jersey which is not part of the combined statistical areas of New York City or Philadelphia. 

The county’s most populous municipality is Phillipsburg, with 15,249 residents at the time of the 2020 census while Hardwick Township had both the largest area  and the fewest people with 1,696 residents. Its county seat is Belvidere.

Warren County was incorporated by an act of the New Jersey Legislature on November 20, 1824, from portions of Sussex County. At its establishment, the county consisted of the townships of Greenwich, Independence, Knowlton, Mansfield, Oxford, and the now defunct Pahaquarry. The county is part of the North Jersey region.

Geography and climate

Warren County has rolling hills with the Kittatinny Ridge in the west. Allamuchy Mountain and Jenny Jump Mountain are part of the New York – New Jersey Highlands, also known as the Reading Prong. Around 450 million years ago, a chain of volcanic islands collided with proto North America. The chain of islands went over the North American Plate, creating the Highlands from the island rock and establishing the Great Appalachian Valley.

The final collision was when the African Plate collided with the North American plate. This was the final episode of the building of the Appalachian Mountains. Then the African plate tore away from North America.

Then the Wisconsin Glacier covered the northern part of the county from 21,000 to 13,000 BC. This glacier covered the top of Kittatinny Mountain and carved the terrain in the northern part of the county. The terminal moraine runs from north of Belvidere to the south of Great Meadows to north of Hackettstown, to the north of Budd Lake.  Blairstown Township, Hope Township, half of Independence Township, part of White Township, and all of Allamuchy Township was covered by the Glacier.  When the glacier melted, a lake was formed at Great Meadows. Slowly the lake drained leaving a large flat area filled with organic material.

The county is drained by three rivers. All three rivers are shallow and narrow.  They are fresh water rivers that are excellent for fishing.  
The Paulins Kill drains the western portion of the county. The river flows from Newton to Blairstown Township, and then through Knowlton Township where it drains into the Delaware River. The Pequest River drains the middle of the county flowing from Andover Township through Allamuchy, then to Independence Township where it turns west and flows through White Township and then empties into the Delaware River at Belvidere. The third river is the Musconetcong. Starting at Lake Musconetcong, the river divides the county from Morris and Hunterdon.  This river drains the southern portion of the county and empties into the Delaware River near Warren Glen.

Warren County is located in two valleys of the Great Appalachian Valley. The first is the Kittatinny Valley, which is in the northern part of the county, and the Lehigh Valley, which borders the southern part of the county.

The Lehigh Valley starts at the terminal moraine of the Wisconsin Glacier slightly north of Belvidere. It extends from the Delaware River south to where the Musconetcong River enters the Delaware River, northeast to the Jenny Jump Mountains and then along Route 80 to the Allamuchy Mountains to the terminal moraine near Hackettstown.

The Kittatinny Valley is north of the terminal moraine; it runs north of Belvidere, to south of Great Meadows, then east to the north of Hackettstown.  Towns such as Blairstown, Johnsonburg, Hope and Allamuchy are in the Kittatinny Valley

ZIP code locations

Climate and weather
Warren County has a humid continental climate (Dfa/Dfb). The hardiness zones are 6a and 6b.

History

Etymology
The county was named for Joseph Warren, an American Revolutionary War hero of the Battle of Bunker Hill.

Prehistory
After the Wisconsin Glacier melted around 13,000 B.C., the area slowly warmed, but was still cold and wet. The receding glaciers left vast bodies of water and swamp areas throughout modern-day Warren County. There was a huge lake at Great Meadows. At first the area was tundra, in which lichens and mosses grew. Later, grasslands filled in the landscape. As climate warmed over a thousand years, taiga / boreal forests grew. The water drained slowly from the glacier and so grasslands grew first. Big game such as mastodons, mammoths, and caribou came into the area, as well as other game such as rabbits and foxes. These animals ate the lichens, moss, and grasses that grew. This is when Paleo Indians moved into the area. The area was rich in wildlife. Paleo-Indians lived in small groups and traveled in search of game and plants to eat. They were hunter-gathers. They lived near water and moved after game became scarce in the area. They ate various berries and plants as well as game hunted. They also ate fresh water clams and fish that migrated north in the Delaware River to spawn such as shad and sturgeon. Fish were caught by spears or fish traps made of stones and sticks. The shallow riffles in rivers were used to catch fish.

They made spear points of jasper, quartz, shale, or black chert. They traveled to quarries in search of stones for spear points or they traded with other small groups for these points. They also used atl-atls, which is a stick that throws a dart with a lighter stone point than a spear. Later, coniferous forests grew as the area warmed. Paleo-Indian campsites are many feet below the present ground surface, making them difficult to locate.

Mastodon bones dating back over 10,000 years have been found in Allamuchy, Blairstown, Hope, Independence, Liberty, and Mansfield townships.

The megafauna of the tundra, such as the caribou, either moved north as the climate warmed or became extinct. Some Paleo Indians moved north with the caribou.

There are four Paleo Indian sites. One is in Warren County and the other three are nearby. The Plenge site located on the north side of the Musconetcong River in Franklin Township, Warren County. This site is estimated at 10,000 B.C. The Zierdt site is located near the Delaware River in Montague Township. The next is the Dutchess Cave in Orange County, New York, just east of the Wallkill River. This site is dated at 10,580 B.C. + or – 370 years. Caribou bones and a spear point was located at this site. The last is the Shawnee site located north of the Delaware Water Gap on the west side of the river, where Broadhead Creek enters the Delaware in Pennsylvania. This site is dated from charcoal found at 8640 B.C. + or – 300 years.

As climate warmed further, hemlock began to grow followed by deciduous trees around 8000 B.C. such as oaks, and maples. This was the beginning of the Archaic period, in which projectile points were no longer fluted but indented at the bottom of the stone point. Oak nuts and other seeds were eaten at this time.  Harry's Farm site in Pahaquarry Township is an Archaic hunters camp with charcoal dating at 5430 B.C. + or – 120 years. Also the Plenge site was an Archaic camp in Franklin Township.

As climate warmed further around 3,000 B.C., beech, walnut, hickories, chestnut, and butternut grew. These trees produced nuts for feeding Archaic hunters; Archaic Indian populations grew more rapidly. As populations grew, large families became small tribes in various areas. During this time the 12 prominent hardwood tree species of Eastern North America existed in Warren County, which were Ash, Beech, Birch, Cherry, Chestnut, Elm, Hickory, Maple, Oak, Sweet Gum, Sycamore, and Walnut. The Chestnut tree is now extinct in Warren County, following the Chestnut blight that decimated the eastern U.S. in the earlier twentieth century. The Archaic period lasted from 8000 B.C. to 1000 B.C.

Native Americans
Around 1000 B.C. clay pottery was beginning to be used. This was the beginning of the Woodland period. With this advancement in technology, Native people could cook food better as well as store food.

Technological innovations occurred around the year 500 A. D. with the invention of the bow and arrow; as projectile points became smaller to fit onto an arrow shaft. Now Native Americans could procure more food as they could be further away from game to kill it. Atl-atls were still being used.  This allowed Native Americans at this time to procure more food, as game could be taken at a longer distance.  Food such as nuts could be stored in clay pots or the pots were used for cooking

Various cultures of indigenous peoples occupied the area at that time.

Eventually ancestors of the Algonquian-speaking Lenape moved into the area, perhaps as early as 1000 AD from the Mississippi River area.

Agriculture also started around that time, with the cultivation of corn, beans, and squash.  Seeds were probably procured from traveling groups or tribes.  Settlements of family groups became more stable, as they could store food in pottery, as well as procure more game with the bow and arrow. Agriculture contributed to the rise of population density in areas where crops could be grown. The Lenape would tend their oval gardens during the spring and summer months. They fished with nets or by hand in the shallow rivers. The Lenape trapped game with deadfalls and snares.

Problems developed in the early 17th century when the Little Ice Age started in North America. The late frost in May and June and early frosts in August or September, made the growing of crops difficult. Cold weather also made big and small game more difficult to hurt, as some game animals would hibernate.  Also nut crops from oak, hickory, beech, walnut, butternut, and chestnut, failed at times; making the supply of these nuts scarce. Rivers froze early, and water became cold fast; so fishing became impossible. The Native populations had declined after epidemics of infectious diseases, for which they had no acquired immunity.  Native American populations were separated from Europe for thousands of years and had no immunity to these diseases that the Europeans brought with them. Many Native American populations were weakened from starvation due to the Little Ice Age, which was coldest during the 17th century. Their important corn, bean and squash crops failed due to spring frosts and early frosts in autumn.  As the Native American population declined, more land was available for European settlement. All these factors made the Native American populations decline dramatically.  
  
Europeans purchased land known as land patents so Native Americans moved west to Ohio or Canada.

European settlement
The Dutch settled the Hudson River Valley and claimed all lands west of the Hudson River in the early 17th century. They claimed all land between the 40th and 45th latitudes. They traded with the Native Americans for furs, such as beaver, otter, muskrat, and deer. The Dutch built a fort at the southern end of Manhattan Island known as Fort Amsterdam. This was their main fort in North America. They also had other forts along the Hudson River up to Albany, New York. The English took over the Fort Amsterdam in August 1664 and gain control of the land the Dutch claimed. There was a ten-year war that followed with England and the Netherlands, but the English won.

Since the English owned the Province of New Jersey, it was divided into two parts; East and West Jersey. The Quintipartite Deed of 1674 to 1702; divided the province of Jersey with two surveys: the Keith Line and the Coxe-Barclay line, which created the border of eastern Sussex county from the headwaters of the Pequannock River with a line going northeast to the line of the Province of New Jersey and New York. The western border was the Delaware River.

The area which was to be Warren County was part of Burlington County in 1694. The area became Hunterdon County in 1714. In 1739, the area of Warren County was included in Morris County. Later Sussex County separated from Morris County but the area of which was to be Warren County was included in Sussex County in 1753.

During the French and Indian War of 1754, fortified homes or small forts were built along the Delaware River from Phillipsburg to Port Jervis, New York.  The mountains of Warren County were the frontier of the war.   Hostilities between the British and the French began to spill over from the European continent into the colonies in the New World. This was due to land claims by the English and French in western Pennsylvania and the Ohio River Valley area. After the battle of Jumonville Glen in southwestern Pennsylvania in May 1754, French colonists in North America armed several Native American tribes. The Native Americans sided with the French due to poor treatment by the British; unfair land purchases, and the Walking Purchase in eastern Pennsylvania of September 1737.

During the French and Indian War (as the Seven Years' War's hostilities in North America were called), Sussex County was often raided by bands of Native Americans, among them members of the Lenape, Shawnee, and Iroquois who fought against white settlers. In 1756, a small band of Lenape raided the homes of local militia commanders, killing several members of the Swartout family and kidnapping other settlers during the Hunt-Swartout raid. In response to these aggressions, Royal Governor Jonathan Belcher approved a plan for 8 forts to be constructed along the Delaware River to defend the New Jersey frontier from such incursions, and authorized the New Jersey Frontier Guard to man them. Several of these forts were little more than blockhouses, others were personal homes that were fortified. These forts went from Phillipsburg northward to Belvidere in Warren County. Then north of Blairstown to Van Campen's Inn. Then north along the eastern side of the Delaware River to Port Jervis, New York. The first fort was called Fort Reading. This fort was near the Pequest River on the south side of the river near the Belvidere-Riverton Bridge. This fort was built in 1757. The second fort was Ellison's Fort built of stone in Knowlton Township. This fort is located at the Delaware River Family Campground. The trail went through the Kittatinny Mountains north of Blairstown to Colonel Isaac Van Campen's Inn 1742, about 18 miles northeast of Fort Reading. Fort John also called Headquarters Fort was up a hill near Van Campens Fort. The next fortification was Fort Walpack build six miles north of Van Campens Fort in the bow of Walpack Bend around 1756. This is in Walpack Township. About six miles north of Walpack Fort is Fort Nominack 1756, which is located just north of Jager Road and Old Mine Road in Sandyston Township. The next fort was Fort Shipeconk 1757 located 4 miles north of the previous fort. A fortified house owned by Captain Abraham Shimer was very close to Fort Shipeconk. Further north the next fortified house was maintained west of Port Jervis, New York and it was called Fort Cole. After Fort Cole there was Fort Gardner which was located north of Port Jervis below the Great Mountain. After the war ended in 1763, there was very few Native Americans left in Warren county.

In the present-day Phillipsburg area, European settlement occurred in the late 17th century. Surveyors from Philadelphia went north along the Delaware River to survey land.  Settlers from Philadelphia moved north into present-day Warren County after colonists purchased land from the Native Americans. As the Native American population declined, more land was available for European settlement.

By the late 1700s/early 1800s, Phillipsburg, Hackettstown, Belvidere, and Washington emerged as small settlements and served as the cornerstone communities in lower Sussex County. In 1824, Warren County was established and Belvidere was named as its county seat.

Demographics

The county is part of the Lehigh Valley/Allentown-Bethlehem-Easton, PA-NJ Metropolitan Statistical Area.

2020 census

2010 census

2000 census
As of the 2000 United States census there were 102,437 people, 38,660 households, and 27,487 families residing in the county.  The population density was 286 people per square mile (111/km²).  There were 41,157 housing units at an average density of 115 per square mile (44/km²).  The racial makeup of the county was 94.54% White, 1.87% Black or African American, 0.11% Native American, 1.21% Asian, 0.02% Pacific Islander, 1.01% from other races, and 1.24% from two or more races.  3.66% of the population were Hispanic or Latino of any race. Among those residents listing their ancestry,  24.1% were of German, 19.7% Irish, 18.7% Italian, 9.8% English, 8.9% Polish and 4.4% American ancestry according to Census 2000.

There were 38,660 households out of which 34.70% had children under the age of 18 living with them, 58.20% were married couples living together, 9.20% had a female householder with no husband present, and 28.90% were non-families. 24.00% of all households were made up of individuals and 10.00% had someone living alone who was 65 years of age or older.  The average household size was 2.61 and the average family size was 3.12.

In the county, the population was spread out with 26.10% under the age of 18, 6.30% from 18 to 24, 31.30% from 25 to 44, 23.50% from 45 to 64, and 12.90% who were 65 years of age or older.  The median age was 38 years. For every 100 females there were 94.90 males.  For every 100 females age 18 and over, there were 91.10 males.

The median income for a household in the county was $56,100, and the median income for a family was $66,223. Males had a median income of $47,331 versus $31,790 for females. The per capita income for the county was $25,728.  About 3.6% of families and 5.4% of the population were below the poverty line, including 5.9% of those under age 18 and 6.7% of those age 65 or over.

Municipalities

The 22 municipalities in Warren County, with Census-designated places (CDPs) and other communities listed, are:

Historical Municipalities
 Pahaquarry Township (1854-1997)

Government

County government

Warren County is governed by the three-member Warren County Board of County Commissioners who are chosen at-large on a staggered basis in partisan elections with one seat coming up for election each year as part of the November general election. At an annual reorganization meeting held at the beginning of January, the board selects one of its members to serve as director and another as deputy director. In 2016, commissioners were paid $24,000 and the head Commissioner had an annual salary of $25,000. , Warren County's Commissioners are (with terms for director and deputy director ending every December 31st):

Pursuant to Article VII Section II of the New Jersey State Constitution, each county in New Jersey is required to have three elected administrative officials known as "constitutional officers." These officers are the County Clerk and County Surrogate (both elected for five-year terms of office) and the County Sheriff (elected for a three-year term). Constitutional officers of Warren County are:

The County's prosecutor is James L. Pfeiffer of Pohatcong, who was nominated by Governor of New Jersey Phil Murphy and sworn into office in November 2019 after being confirmed by the New Jersey Senate. Warren County is a part of Vicinage 13 of the New Jersey Superior Court (along with Somerset County and Hunterdon County), which is seated at the Somerset County Courthouse in Somerville; the Assignment Judge for Vicinage 15 is the Honorable Yolanda Ciccone. The Warren County Courthouse is in Belvidere. Law enforcement at the county level is provided by the Warren County Sheriff's Office and the Warren County Prosecutor's Office. Emergency services are provided by the Warren County Public Safety Department and the county's municipal fire and police departments.

Former commissioners
 2012–2018 Edward Smith (R)
 2004–12 – Everett Chamberlain (R)
 2010 – Angelo Accetturo (R)
 2001–03 – Michael J. Doherty (R)
 2001–09 – John DiMaio (R)
 2000–02 – James DeBosh (D)
 1997–99 – Stephen Lance (R)
 1996-00 – Ann Stone (D)
 1993-01 – Susan Dickey (R)
 1989–94 – Jacob Matthenius (R)
 1988–96 – Kenneth Miller (R)
 1986–88 – Anthony Fowler (R)
 1984–87 – Charles Lee (R)
 1981–83 – George Thompson (R)
 1980–82 – Kenneth Keyes (R)
 1979–81 – Chuck Haytaian (R)
 1977–79 – Christopher Maier (D)
 1976–78 – Irene Smith (D)
 1975–77 – Benjamin Bosco (D)
 1974–76 – Raymond Stem (D)
 1973–75 – Frank Seney (R)
 1968–73 – Herman Shotwell (D)

Federal representatives 
Warren County falls entirely within the 7th congressional district.

State representatives 
The 22 municipalities of Warren County are represented by two separate legislative districts.

Politics 
Warren County has long been a consistently conservative county in local, state, and national elections, much like the neighboring counties of Sussex and Hunterdon. All of its state legislators and countywide elected officials are Republicans, as are the vast majority of municipal officials. As of October 1, 2021, there were a total of 88,776 registered voters in Warren County, of whom 34,573 (38.9%) were registered as Republicans, 22,917 (25.8%) were registered as Democrats and 30,055 (33.9%) were registered as unaffiliated. There were 1,231 voters (1.4%) registered to other parties.

In the 2008 presidential election, John McCain carried Warren County by a 14% margin over Barack Obama, with Obama winning statewide by 15.5% over McCain. In the 2012 U.S. presidential election, Mitt Romney carried the county by a 15.4% margin over Barack Obama. In the 2016 U.S. presidential election, Donald Trump carried the county by a 25.3% margin over Hillary Clinton. In 2020, Trump carried Warren County by a 16.1% margin over Joe Biden.

|}

In the 2009 gubernatorial election, Republican Chris Christie received 61% of the vote, defeating Democrat Jon Corzine, who received around 26%. In the 2013 gubernatorial election, Chris Christie received 72.6% of the vote, defeating Democratic challenger Barbara Buono, who received 25% of the vote. In the 2017 gubernatorial election, Republican Kim Guadango received 61.2% of the vote, while the eventual statewide winner Democrat Phil Murphy received 25.4% of the vote. In the 2021 gubernatorial election, Republican Jack Ciattarelli defeated governor Phil Murphy in the county by 29.6%.

Transportation

Roads and highways

The county has a few notable state and federal roads. The chief state routes are Route 31, a north–south road that runs from Buttzville in White Township to Trenton, and Route 57 that runs between Lopatcong Township to Hackettstown.  Route 94 in the northern part runs through Blairstown into New York via Newton and the rest of Sussex County. Route 173 runs near Bloomsbury into Hunterdon County, terminating at Clinton/Annandale, and Route 182 serves as one of the commercial areas of Hackettstown. The US Routes are U.S. Route 22 in the Phillipsburg area and U.S. Route 46 runs from Columbia to Hackettstown in the northern section. The two interstates that pass through are the Phillipsburg-Newark Expressway (Interstate 78), and the Bergen-Passaic Expressway (Interstate 80).

Air
By air, the county is served by Lehigh Valley International Airport in Allentown to the west and Newark Liberty International Airport to the east.

Bus
Warren County also contracts with Easton Coach to provide demand-responsive service, as well as limited fixed-route service along the Route 31 and Route 57 corridors. NJ Transit operates the No. 890 & No. 891 buses in the Phillipsburg area.

Rail
Warren County has a single NJ Transit train stop, located at the Hackettstown station on the Montclair-Boonton Line and the Morristown Line.

The Norfolk Southern Railway's Lehigh Line (formerly the mainline of the Lehigh Valley Railroad), runs through the southern Warren County on its way to Phillipsburg.

Education

Colleges
Centenary University is a private college located in Hackettstown that is affiliated with the United Methodist Church.
Warren County Community College, in Washington Township, offers both associate and bachelor's degree programs and certificate programs. The College serves approximately 1,700 full-time and part-time students, in addition to students in non-credit programs and courses. The college is able to offer bachelor programs through partnerships with four-year colleges.

Private secondary schools

 Blair Academy is a college preparatory school located in Blairstown, founded in 1848 with a gift from John Insley Blair.

School districts
School districts in Warren County include:

K-12 districts
Belvidere School District
Hackettstown School District
Phillipsburg School District
Warren County Special Services School District

Secondary districts
North Warren Regional High School 7–12
Warren County Vocational School District 9–12
Warren Hills Regional School District 7–12

Elementary districts

Alpha School District K–8
Allamuchy Township School District K–8
Blairstown Township School District K–6
Franklin Township School District (Warren County, New Jersey) K–6
Frelinghuysen Township School District K–6
Great Meadows Regional School District K–8 
Greenwich Township School District K–8
Harmony Township School District K–8
Hope Township School District K–8
Knowlton Township School District K–6
Lopatcong Township School District K–8
Mansfield Township School District K–6
Oxford Township School District K–8
Pohatcong Township School District K–8
Washington Borough Public Schools K–6
Washington Township School District K–6
White Township School District K–8

Public high schools
 Belvidere High School, a part of the Belvidere School District (PreK-12) with students attending from Harmony, Hope and White townships
 Hackettstown High School, a part of the Hackettstown School District (PreK-12) with students from Allamuchy, Independence, and Liberty townships
 North Warren Regional High School, which serves the northern townships of Blairstown (where the school is located), Frelinghuysen, Hardwick and Knowlton
 Phillipsburg High School, a part of the Phillipsburg School District (PreK-12) with students attending from Alpha Borough and the Townships of Greenwich, Lopatcong and Pohatcong.
 Warren Hills Regional High School, a part of the Warren Hills Regional School District that serves the Borough of Washington, and the Townships of Washington, Mansfield, Franklin and Oxford (9–12 only)
 Warren County Technical School serves the entire county. It includes grades 9–12 and also has a post secondary night school.

Recreation

Most of Warren County is part of the Warren Hills Viticultural Area, and the county has five active wineries:

 Alba Vineyard
 Brook Hollow Winery
 Four Sisters Winery
 Vacchiano Farm
 Villa Milagro Vineyards

Warren County borders the Delaware Water Gap National Recreation Area and the Middle Delaware National Scenic River. Warren County has many areas for hunting and fishing. The New Jersey Division of Fish and Wildlife houses its Pequest Fish Hatchery, which produces trout and other fish, in Warren County about five miles northeast of Oxford, along U.S. Route 46.  Thousands of trout are raised in this hatchery and also serves as an educational center for other outdoor activity. Wildlife Management Areas in the county include White Lake, Oxford Lake, and the Pequest River W.M.A. The five major rivers or creeks for fishing in Warren County are the Paulinskill, the Pequest, the Musconetcong, Pohatcong Creek, as well as the Delaware River. Merrill Creek Reservoir, located in Harmony Township, is also stocked with fish and has game in the surrounding woods.

See also

Musconetcong County, New Jersey, a proposed county in the 19th Century from parts of Warren and Hunterdon Counties
National Register of Historic Places listings in Warren County, New Jersey

References

External links

Official website
Warren County news at Lehigh Valley Live

 
1824 establishments in New Jersey
North Jersey
Populated places established in 1824